Italy first participated at the European Youth Olympic Festival at the 1991 Summer Festival and has earned medals at both summer and winter festivals.

Medal tables

Medals by Summer Youth Olympic Festival

Medals by Winter Youth Olympic Festival

Medals by sport

References

See also
Italy at the Youth Olympics
Italy at the Olympics

European Youth Olympic Festival
Nations at the European Youth Olympic Festival
European Youth Olympic Festival